Orsotriaena medus is a butterfly found in south Asia, southeast Asia, and Australia. It is the only species in the genus Orsotriaena, first described by Hans Daniel Johan Wallengren in 1858.

Historical name

The butterfly has historically been called the nigger referring to its dark brown colour, but it has been renamed in Australian faunal works to smooth-eyed bushbrown, medus brown in India, and dark grass-brown in Southeast Asia.

Description

The butterfly is dark brown above with a thin marginal pale border. The upper hindwing having a thin submarginal line. There are no eyespots on the upperside of the wings.

Below, the butterfly has a white discal band which runs across both wings. It has five eyespots on the underside of the wings. In the forewing, it has two eyespots, with the anterior eyespot slightly smaller. In the hindwing, it has two eyespots on the apical region and a separate ocellus in the tornal (hindmost) region. The uppermost of the eyespots in the hindwing are greatly smaller, while the remaining two are more or less of equal sizes.

The eggs are spherical and yellowish. They are laid on the leaf blades and stems of grasses. The larvae are spindle shaped, transversely wrinkled, and covered in small tubercles, giving it a rough appearance. Two long brown spines on the head point forward, while a pair of pinkish prongs project from the anal segment. The colour above is rosy red with a blue dorsal and a white lateral line, below which, the underparts are green.

The pupae are perpendicularly suspended, slender and regular, except that the head-case is produced into a long beak formed of two thin processes like split straws. The colour is whitish brown to yellow, with faint bands of a darker shades. It resembles a large grain of barley or a tiny banana.

Orsotriaena medus superficially resembles members of the genus Mycalesis (bushbrowns), but can readily be identified by the number of spots.

Distribution and habitat
Orsotriaena medus is native to India, Sri Lanka, Myanmar, Cambodia, Thailand, southern Yunnan, Malaysia, the Indonesian archipelago, the Philippines, New Guinea, New Britain and Australia.

In India, the butterfly occurs in South India, Punjab, Uttar Pradesh, Bihar, West Bengal, Sikkim, Assam, Nagaland, the Andaman and Nicobar Islands.

A shy, weak-flying insect, it stays low amongst the undergrowth, and when disturbed flies for a short distance before settling down. The butterfly basks in the sun, often with its body aligned parallel to the sun's rays.

Taxonomy

Orsotriaena medus is classified under the subfamily Satyrinae (the browns) of the brush-footed butterfly family Nymphalidae. Orsotriaena medus is divided into several subspecies, listed below with their respective synonyms and geographical ranges.

Orsotriaena Wallengren, 1858
syn. Orstriaena Young, 1903; Orsotrioena Bingham, 1905
Orsotriaena medus (Fabricius, 1775)
syn. Papilio medus Fabricius, 1775; Mycalesis mandosa Butler, 1868
 Orsotriaena medus cinerea (Butler, 1867) – Sundaland
syn. Mycalesis cinerea Butler, 1867
 Orsotriaena medus jopas (Hewitson, 1864) – North Sulawesi
syn. Mycalesis jopas Hewitson, 1864
Orsotriaena medus mandata (Moore, 1857) – Sri Lanka, South India
syn. Mycalesis mandata Moore, 1857
 Orsotriaena medus medus (Fabricius, 1775) – N. India to Thailand, Timor, the Philippines, Papua New Guinea, South Yunnan
syn. Papilio hesione Cramer, 1775; Papilio doris Stoll, 1781; Mycalesis runeka Moore, 1857
 Orsotriaena medus mendice (Fruhstorfer, 1911) – South Sulawesi
syn. Orsotriaena mendice Fruhstorfer 1911
 Orsotriaena medus moira (Waterhouse & Lyell, 1914) – Banks Island, Darnley Island, Cape York
syn. Orsotriaena moira Waterhouse & Lyell, 1914
 Orsotriaena medus mutata (Butler, 1875) – New Britain
syn. Orsotriaena mutata Butler, 1875
 Orsotriaena medus paupercula (Fruhstorfer, 1908) – Sula Islands
syn. Orsotriaena paupercula Fruhstorfer, 1908
 Orsotriaena medus zipoetina (Fruhstorfer, 1908) – Sumatra
syn. Orsotriaena zipoetina Fruhstorfer, 1908

Ecology and behaviour
The larvae feed on grasses, including rice plants (Oryza sativa), sugarcanes (Saccharum officinarum), and para grass (Brachiaria mutica). They are predominantly crepuscular, but can sometimes be active during daytime.

See also
Mycalesis

References

External links
 Review of book on Australian insect names

Elymniini
Butterflies of Asia
Butterflies of Malaysia
Butterflies of Indonesia
Butterflies of Singapore
Butterflies of Borneo
Butterflies of Indochina
Taxa named by Johan Christian Fabricius
Butterflies described in 1775